Eucampyvirinae is a subfamily of viruses in the order Caudovirales, in the family Myoviridae. Bacteria of the genus Campylobacter serve as natural hosts. There are 9 species in this subfamily, assigned to 2 genera.

Species and genera
The following genera and species are recognized:
 Genus: Firehammervirus
 Campylobacter virus CP21
 Campylobacter virus CP220
 Campylobacter virus CPt10
 Campylobacter virus IBB35
 Genus: Fletchervirus
 Campylobacter virus CP81
 Campylobacter virus CP30A
 Campylobacter virus CPX
 Campylobacter virus Los1
 Campylobacter virus NCTC12673

References

 ICTV proposals, 2013.004a-kB et al., "create two genera (Cp220likevirus and Cp8unalikevirus) within a new subfamily (Eucampyvirinae) in the family Myoviridae", Andrew M. Kropinski et al.

External links
 ICTV

Myoviridae
Virus subfamilies